The gastrocolic reflex or gastrocolic response is a physiological reflex that controls the motility, or peristalsis, of the gastrointestinal tract following a meal. It involves an increase in motility of the colon consisting primarily of giant migrating contractions, or migrating motor complexes, in response to stretch in the stomach following ingestion and byproducts of digestion entering the small intestine. Thus, this reflex is responsible for the urge to defecate following a meal. The small intestine also shows a similar motility response. The gastrocolic reflex's function in driving existing intestinal contents through the digestive system helps make way for ingested food.

The reflex was demonstrated by myoelectric recordings in the colons of animals and humans, which showed an increase in electrical activity within as little as 15 minutes after eating.  The recordings also demonstrated that the gastrocolic reflex is uneven in its distribution throughout the colon.  The sigmoid colon is more greatly affected than the rest of the colon in terms of a phasic response, recurring periods of contraction followed by relaxation, in order to propel food distally into the rectum; however, the tonic response across the colon is uncertain. These contractions are generated by the muscularis externa stimulated by the myenteric plexus. When pressure within the rectum becomes increased, the gastrocolic reflex acts as a stimulus for defecation.  A number of neuropeptides have been proposed as mediators of the gastrocolic reflex. These include serotonin, neurotensin, cholecystokinin, prostaglandin E1, and gastrin.

Clinical significance 
Clinically, the gastrocolic reflex has been implicated in pathogenesis of irritable bowel syndrome (IBS): the very act of eating or drinking can provoke an overreaction of the gastrocolic response in some patients with IBS due to their heightened visceral sensitivity, and this can lead to abdominal pain and distension, flatulence, and diarrhea. The gastrocolic reflex has also been implicated in pathogenesis of functional constipation, where patients with spinal cord injury and diabetics with gastroparesis secondary to diabetic neuropathy have an increased colonic transit time.

The gastrocolic reflex can also be used to optimise the treatment of constipation. Since the reflex is most active in the mornings and immediately after meals, consumption of stimulant laxatives, such as sennosides and bisacodyl, during these times will augment the reflex and help increase colonic contractions and therefore defecation.

References

External links

Reflexes
Physiology
Stomach